Panaqolus changae is a species of catfish in the family Loricariidae. It is native to South America, where it occurs in the basins of the Itaya River and the Momón River in Peru. The species reaches 8.5 cm (3.3 inches) SL and its specific epithet honors Fonchii Chang, a Peruvian ichthyologist of the National University of San Marcos. It appears in the aquarium trade, where it is referred to either as the Iquitos tiger pleco, referencing the fact that the species is known to occur near the city of Iquitos, or by its L-number, which is L-226.

References 

Ancistrini
Fish described in 2002